Tania Nehme (born September 1966) is an Australian film editor. She has edited a number of films directed by Rolf de Heer and won and been nominated for many awards for her editing work, including an Australian Film Institute Award for Best Editing for the 2006 film Ten Canoes.

Career
Nehme is a graduate of the Australian Film Television and Radio School, and has worked as a film editor since 1986. She began her career by working on commercials, documentaries and short drama films.

In 1991 she was nominated for an AFI Award for her work on a short drama film, Once in a Time.

Apart from feature films (some of which are listed below), she worked on Barron Television children's series Chuck Finn, the SBS Australia documentary Kumarangk 5214, and a short feature funded by the Australian Film Commission called The 13th House.

Selected filmography

References

1966 births
Living people
Australian film editors
Walkley Award winners
Australian women film editors